William Towns (1936–1993) also known as Bill Towns was a British car designer.

Design career
Towns began his training as a designer at Rootes in 1954, where he was mainly involved in the styling of seats and door handles. Later he was also involved with the styling of their Hillman Hunter. He moved to Rover in 1963 and worked there for David Bache and designed the body of the Rover-BRM gas turbine Le Mans car. In 1966, he left Rover to join Aston Martin as a seat designer, eventually becoming the force behind the Aston Martin Lagonda.

He left Aston Martin in 1977 for more remunerative industrial design work, setting up his own design studio, Interstyl. As a freelance designer, he worked on the Jensen-Healey, the successful Hustler kit-car, the Reliant SS2 and the short-lived Railton F28/F29.

Death
Towns died at the age of 56 or 57 from cancer in June 1993 at his home in Moreton-in-Marsh, Gloucestershire.

Car collection
Up until July 2005, his own cars were on display at the Heritage Motor Centre, Gaydon, UK.

Gallery

Cars designed by Towns
 1964 Rover-BRM gas turbine car (with David Bache)
 1967 Aston Martin DBS
 1972 Jensen-Healey
 1972 Minissima
 1974 Aston Martin Lagonda
 1974 Guyson E12
 1976 Microdot
 1976 Aston Martin Lagonda Series 2
 1978 Hustler
 1980 Aston Martin Bulldog
 1985 TXC Tracer
 1988 Reliant SS2
 1992 Reliant Scimitar Sabre 
 1989 Railton F28 Fairmile and F29 Claremont

References

External links

 Biography
 Interview with William Towns on Wheels TV programme

1993 deaths
British automobile designers
1936 births
People from Moreton-in-Marsh
Deaths from cancer in England